Carson is a city in Pottawattamie County, Iowa, United States. The population was 766 at the 2020 census. Carson has a number of interesting and historic places.

History
Carson was formed in 1881 as a result of the establishment of a depot on the Burlington and Rock Island Railroad at this location during the previous year. Carson is within the Riverside Community School District. The district formed on July 1, 1993 with the merger of the Carson-Macedonia and Oakland districts.

Geography
Carson's longitude and latitude coordinatesin decimal form are 41.235744, -95.418427. The city is located along the West Nishnabotna River.

Demographics

2010 census
As of the census of 2010, there were 812 people, 325 households, and 228 families living in the city. The racial makeup of the city was 98.8% White, 0.2% Native American, 0.1% Asian, and 0.9% from two or more races. Hispanic or Latino of any race were 2.3% of the population.

There were 325 households, of which 32.3% had children under the age of 18 living with them, 60.3% were married couples living together, 6.8% had a female householder with no husband present, 3.1% had a male householder with no wife present, and 29.8% were non-families. 25.8% of all households were made up of individuals, and 11% had someone living alone who was 65 years of age or older. The average household size was 2.50 and the average family size was 3.01.

The median age in the city was 39.3 years. 25.2% of residents were under the age of 18; 5.6% were between the ages of 18 and 24; 25.8% were from 25 to 44; 27.1% were from 45 to 64; and 16.4% were 65 years of age or older. The gender makeup of the city was 46.4% male and 53.6% female.

2000 census
As of the census of 2000, there were 668 people, 285 households, and 200 families living in the city. The racial makeup of the city was 99.10% White, 0.15% Asian, 0.30% from other races, and 0.45% from two or more races.

There were 285 households, out of which 27.7% had children under the age of 18 living with them, 60.0% were married couples living together, 8.1% had a female householder with no husband present, and 29.8% were non-families. 26.3% of all households were made up of individuals, and 14.0% had someone living alone who was 65 years of age or older. The average household size was 2.34 and the average family size was 2.83.

22.2% are under the age of 18, 8.5% from 18 to 24, 25.6% from 25 to 44, 25.7% from 45 to 64, and 18.0% who were 65 years of age or older. The median age was 40 years. For every 100 females, there were 86.6 males. For every 100 females age 18 and over, there were 87.7 males.

The median income for a household in the city was $41,719, and the median income for a family was $50,000. Males had a median income of $35,804 versus $21,071 for females. The per capita income for the city was $18,831. About 4.9% of families and 8.0% of the population were below the poverty line, including 10.6% of those under age 18 and 13.6% of those age 65 or over.

Notable person

Hubert Houser (born 1942), Iowa State Senator from the 49th District

References

External links

 
Carson, Iowa official website

Cities in Iowa
Cities in Pottawattamie County, Iowa
Populated places established in 1881
1881 establishments in Iowa